The Crystal Ballroom (also known as The Ballroom and Seaview Ballroom) was a music venue located within the Seaview Hotel on Fitzroy Street in St Kilda, an inner suburb of Melbourne, Victoria, Australia. It has often been referred to as the centerpiece of Melbourne's post-punk movement, showcasing groups such as The Birthday Party, Dead Can Dance and Crime and the City Solution, as well as being a mainstay of the Little Band scene.

Named after the venue's ornate Victorian age ballroom and chandeliers, the Crystal Ballroom was run by a succession of music promoters from 1978 to 1987, starting with Dolores San Miguel (who also ran other prominent Melbourne venues, including St Kilda's Esplanade Hotel), and later by Laurie Richards, founder of the Tiger Lounge in Richmond and the Jump Club in Fitzroy. Nigel Rennard, owner of Missing Link Records, was the venue's final owner.

History

Dolores San Miguel took charge of the venue from its previous occupants in August 1978. The first band to play there was JAB, who relocated from Adelaide. On 2 September 1978, San Miguel took control of the Ballroom and opened it up as the "Wintergarden Room". The first gig in the Seaview Ballroom was headlined by The Birthday Party, featuring Nick Cave, Mick Harvey Phill Calvert and Rowland S. Howard. The Ballroom ran every Saturday night until it was taken over by Laurie Richards in February 1979. Richards renamed the venue the "Crystal Ballroom" and operated it under that name until 10 January 1981, although San Miguel returned in April 1980 to run weeknight gigs in what she christened the "Paradise Lounge" on the ground floor. Melbourne's Little Band scene flourished here in 1980. After Laurie left, San Miguel co-ran the Crystal Ballroom, which was renamed the Seaview Ballroom, with Nigel Rennard until a falling out in September 1981, whereby San Miguel vacated her position. Rennard ran it until the end of 1983. Dolores returned as the venue's owner in 1984. She ran it until 1986 before the hotel was closed for business in 1987.

In 1979, Crystal Ballroom Records was established to release special-pressed seven-inch singles, which were given away for free at the venue at the end of a number of gigs. Bands who recorded songs for Crystal Ballroom Records include The Birthday Party, Tsk Tsk Tsk and Models.

The Birthday Party played their last ever show at the venue on 9 June 1983 and disbanded a few months later. Later that year, Cave organised a New Year's Show at the Ballroom, playing under the moniker Nick Cave: Man or Myth?, a group now recognised as the first incarnation of Nick Cave and the Bad Seeds.

The Crystal Ballroom was a staging ground for major Melbourne bands such as The Birthday Party, Dead Can Dance, Hunters and Collectors, Models, Crime and the City Solution and The Moodists, as well as visiting Sydney bands INXS, The Laughing Clowns and Midnight Oil, and Brisbane's The Go-Betweens and The Saints. International bands who played there include Simple Minds, The Cure, Magazine, Echo & the Bunnymen, The Psychedelic Furs, XTC, The Residents, Snakefinger, PiL, The Gun Club, Iggy Pop, The Fall and Dead Kennedys.

Legacy
The venue, and its association with a host of local and international music acts, has been documented in a wide range of media. The Crystal Ballroom scene inspired the creation of a number of zines, including Pulp, Fast Forward and Tension. Artist Jenny Watson, one of the venue's regulars, captured its subculture in a series of paintings; Nick Cave used one of Watson's paintings as an onstage prop during a 1979 show at the Ballroom. Noted Australian culture critic Clinton Walker devoted much of his first book, Inner City Sound (1981), to the Ballroom, and in his fourth book Stranded: The Secret History of Australian Independent Music 1977-1991 (1996), he revisits the time and place in greater detail. The 1986 punk film Dogs in Space, directed by Richard Lowenstein, is partially shot and set in the Crystal Ballroom, and stars many musicians, artists and others who frequented the venue. The Ballroom's role in Melbourne music is also reflected upon in Lowenstein's 2011 documentary We're Livin' on Dog Food. In 2011, San Miguel published a book titled The Ballroom: The Melbourne Punk & Post Punk Scene.

See also
Esplanade Hotel, another prominent alternative music venue in St Kilda
Music of Melbourne

References

Further reading
Books

 
 
 

Music venues in Melbourne
Ballrooms in Australia
Punk rock venues